Fouracre is a surname. Notable people with the surname include:

 Bob Fouracre (1937–2021), American sportscaster
 Lloyd Fouracre (born 1987), British murder victim
 Paul Fouracre, professor of medieval history at the University of Manchester